= Parque Temático 5 de Mayo =

Park in Puebla, Mexico

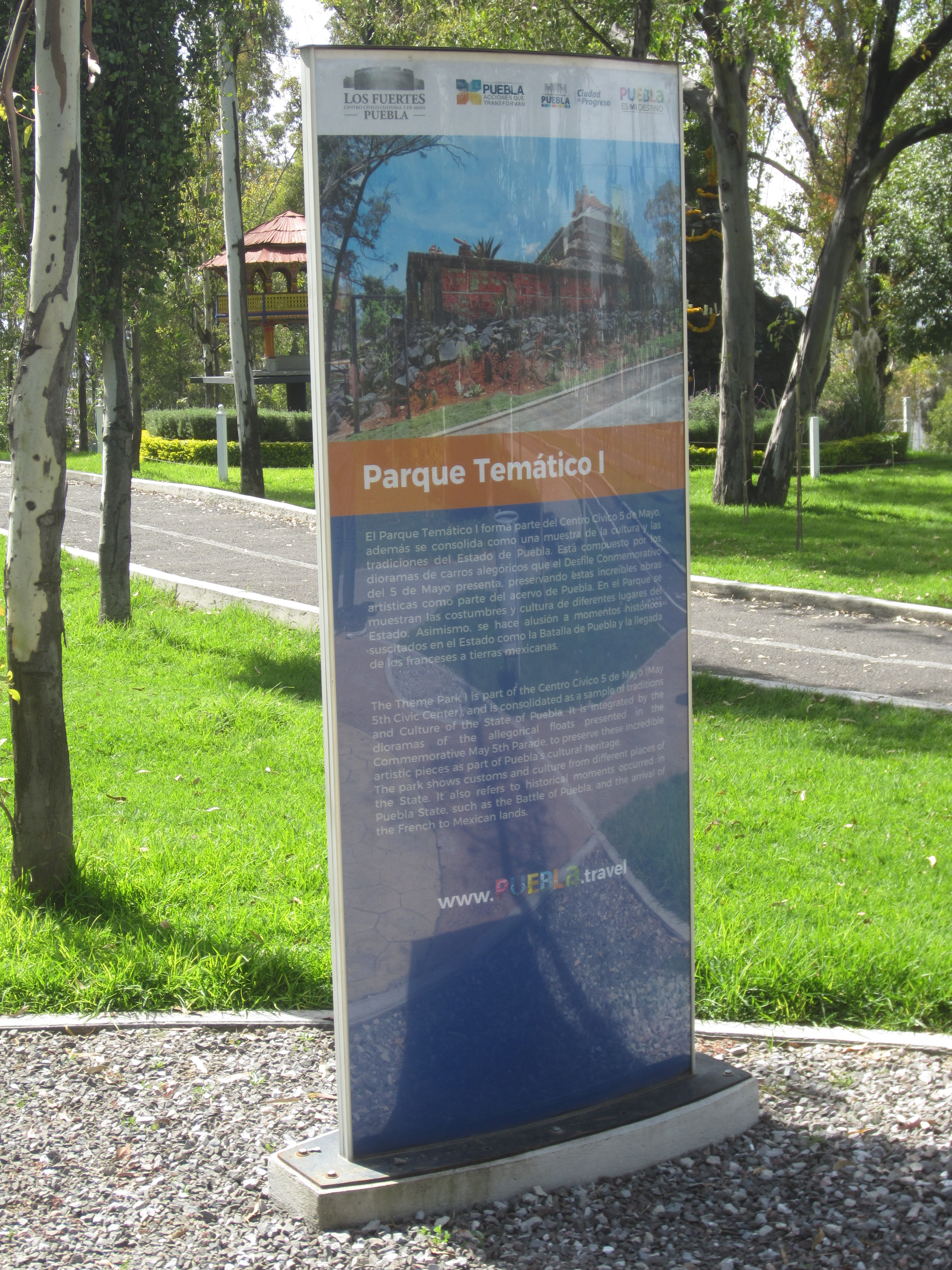
- Park signage, 2018

- Location within Mexico
- Location: Puebla
- Nearest city: Puebla, Mexico
- Coordinates: 19°3′35″N 98°10′59″W

Parque Temático 5 de Mayo is a park in the city of Puebla, in the Mexican state of Puebla.
